Moresi is an Italian surname. Notable people with the surname include:

Attilio Moresi (1937–1993), Swiss cyclist
Fernando Moresi (born 1970), Argentine field hockey player
Louis Moresi (born 1965), British geophysicist
Ludovico Moresi (born 1980), Italian footballer

Italian-language surnames